The Allen Brothers (Austin Allen, February 7, 1901 – January 5, 1959 and Lee Allen, June 1, 1906 – February 24, 1981) were an American country music duo popular in the 1920s and 1930s. They were nicknamed "The Chattanooga Boys" since many of their songs mentioned Chattanooga.

Biography
The brothers were born and raised in Sewanee, Tennessee and they both learned to sing and play musical instruments, Austin played the banjo while Lee concentrated on the guitar and kazoo. As they grew up they were influenced by local jazz and blues artists such as the guitarist and Mississippi river boat performer May Bell and the street singers the Two Poor Boys. By the early 1920s, they were performing in small coal-mining communities in the South doing medicine shows and Vaudeville onstage.

They received a recording contract on Columbia Records and recorded for the first time on April 7, 1927. At this first session they recorded "Salty Dog Blues" which became their first hit selling around 18 000 copies. "Bow Wow Blues" was another notable recording of that time, as it was later placed by music historians in the dirty blues category. Columbia, by mistake, placed one of their recordings in the "race" series (reserved for black artists) instead of its "hillbilly" series. The brothers threatened to bring a lawsuit against Columbia but in the end they decided to move to Victor Records instead. Working with the A&R man Ralph Peer - who had been instrumental in bringing both Jimmie Rodgers and the Carter Family to fame - the Allen Brothers recorded their biggest hit "A New Salty Dog" in 1930. Due to the Great Depression, the brothers had to abandon their musical career in 1934. Although they were successful and sold more than other hillbilly groups - more than 250 000 copies altogether - they could not make a living from their music.

Austin moved to New York and both brothers went to work in the construction business. In the 1960s, when the Allen Brothers were rediscovered by folk revivalists, Austin had already died in South Carolina in 1959 but Lee appeared onstage a few times in Tennessee.

Discography

Footnotes

References
 Carlin, Richard (2003), Country Music: A Biographical Dictionary, Taylor & Francis
 Russell, Tony (2007), Country Music Originals: The Legends and the Lost, Oxford University Press
 Russell, Tony - Pinson, Bob (2004), Country Music Records: A Discography 1921-1942, Oxford University Press
 Tracy, Steven Carl (1999), Write Me A Few of Your Lines: A Blues Reader, University of Massachusetts Press
 Wolff, Kurt - Duane, Orla (2000), Country Music: The Rough Guide, Rough Guides

Country music groups from Tennessee
People from Sewanee, Tennessee